Coscinida decemguttata is a species of comb-footed spider in the family Theridiidae. It is found in the Congo.

References

Theridiidae
Spiders described in 1970